Megalena crassa, is a species of air-breathing land snail, a terrestrial pulmonate gastropod mollusk in the family Enidae.

Megalena is a monotypic genus, i.e. it contains only one species, Megalena crassa and therefore this species is also the type species.

The generic name is composed from the prefix mega-, which means "large" from the ancient Greek language, and from the suffix -ena, for which the etymological origin is unknown.

Specimens of this species are stored in collections in Europe: Germany (Senckenberg Museum, Institute of Zoology and Museum of Zoology of University of Hamburg), Poland (Institute of Zoology of Polish Academy of Sciences in Warszawa) and in the Netherlands.

Distribution 
This species is known only from a few individuals which were found in northwestern Turkey.

Description 
The shell is oval and elongated. The height of the shell is from 23.9 mm to 28.7 mm.

References

External links 

Enidae
Gastropods described in 1887
Endemic fauna of Turkey